Josephine ‘Josie’ McGrath is a former camogie player, three times All Ireland medalist and captain of the All Ireland Camogie Championship winning team in 1935. She won three further All Ireland senior medals in 1934, 1936, when she scored the fifth of Cork's six goals, and 1939.

Career
A member of the powerful Old Aloysius she won several county championships in Cork. Her daughter Deirdre Young played camogie for Cork and Munster.

References

External links
 Camogie.ie Official Camogie Association Website

Cork camogie players
Year of birth missing
Possibly living people